Dharapur is a census town in Kamrup Metropolitan district  in the state of Assam, India.

Demographics
 India census, Dharapur had a population of 7668. Males constitute 54% of the population and females 46%. Dharapur has an average literacy rate of 71%, higher than the national average of 59.5%: male literacy is 74% and, female literacy is 67%. In Dharapur, 10% of the population is under 6 years of age.

References

Cities and towns in Kamrup Metropolitan district